Beatrice Marscheck (born 23 September 1985) is a retired German long jumper.

She finished seventh at the 2009 Summer Universiade and competed at the 2009 World Championships without reaching the final.

Her personal best is 6.73 metres, achieved in June 2009 in Wesel. She represented the club LAZ Gießen.

References

1985 births
Living people
German female long jumpers
Competitors at the 2009 Summer Universiade